Stromal interaction molecule 1 is a protein that in humans is encoded by the STIM1 gene. STIM1 has a single transmembrane domain, and is localized to the endoplasmic reticulum, and to a lesser extent to the plasma membrane.

Even though the protein has been identified earlier, its function was unknown until recently. In 2005, it was discovered that STIM1 functions as a calcium sensor in the endoplasmic reticulum. Upon activation of the IP3 receptor, the calcium concentration in the endoplasmic reticulum decreases, which is sensed by STIM1, via its EF hand domain. STIM1 activates the "store-operated" ORAI1 calcium ion channels in the plasma membrane, via intracellular STIM1 movement, clustering under plasma membrane and protein interaction with ORAI isoforms. STIM1-mediated calcium entry is required for thrombin-induced disassembly of VE-cadherin adherens junctions. 2-Aminoethoxydiphenyl borate (2-APB) and 4-chloro-3-ethylphenol (4-CEP) cause STIM1 clustering in a cell and prevent STIM1 moving toward plasma membrane.

Interactions 

STIM1 has been shown to interact with ORAI1, TMEM110 (STIMATE), SERCA, TMEM66 (SARAF), and STIM2.

References